Nadira, Lady Naipaul (born Nadira Khannum Alvi; 1953), is a Pakistani journalist and the widow of novelist Sir V. S. Naipaul.

Biography
She was born in Mombasa, Kenya. At the age of 16 she married an engineer, Agha Hashim, who was 26 years her senior. They had two daughters, Gul Zehra (aka Naeema Hashim) and Sumar Zahra, who lived with various relatives after the marriage ended. Nadira's second marriage was to Iqbal Shah, by whom she had a daughter Maleeha, whom V. S. Naipaul later adopted, and a son, Nadir Shah.

She worked as a journalist for The Nation, a Pakistani newspaper, for ten years before meeting V.S. Naipaul. He became her third husband when they married in 1996, two months after the death of Naipaul's first wife, Patricia (formerly Patricia Hale).

Lady Naipaul's brother, Ameer Faisal Alavi, a two-star general in the Pakistan Army, was assassinated in 2008.

References

External links

Pakistani women journalists
English people of Pakistani descent
Kenyan people of Pakistani descent
Kenyan emigrants to Pakistan
Living people
1953 births
Naipaul family
People from Mombasa
Wives of knights